Michael McCulloch (ca 1797 – July 12, 1854) was a physician and political figure in Canada East. He represented Terrebonne in the Legislative Assembly of the Province of Canada from 1841 to 1844.

He was born in Ireland and studied medicine in Scotland. He settled in Montreal in 1822 and was licensed to practise medicine in Lower Canada the following year. McCulloch taught obstetrics at McGill College. He was a member of the Royal College of Physicians of London. McCulloch did not run for reelection to the assembly in 1844. He died in Montreal.

A parcel of land formerly owned by Doctor McCulloch was later purchased and became part of Mount Royal Cemetery.

References 
 

1854 deaths
Members of the Legislative Assembly of the Province of Canada from Canada East
Year of birth uncertain
Canadian medical academics
1790s births
Irish emigrants to Canada
Canadian obstetricians
Academic staff of McGill University
19th-century Canadian physicians
Fellows of the Royal College of Physicians